Hypholoma capnoides is an edible mushroom in the family Strophariaceae. Like its poisonous or suspect relatives H. fasciculare ("sulphur tuft") and H. lateritium ("brick caps"), H. capnoides grows in clusters on decaying wood, for example in tufts on old tree stumps, in North America, Europe, and Asia.

Edibility
Though edible, the poisonous sulphur tuft is more common in many areas. H. capnoides has greyish gills due to the dark color of its spores, whereas sulphur tuft has greenish gills. It could also perhaps be confused with the deadly Galerina marginata or the good edible Kuehneromyces mutabilis.

Description 
Cap: Up to 6 cm in diameter with yellow-to-orange-brownish or matt yellow colour, sometimes viscid.
Gills: Initially pale orangish-yellow, pale grey when mature, later darker purple/brown.
Spore powder: Dark burgundy/brown.
Stipe: Yellowish, somewhat rust-brown below.
Taste: Mild (other Hypholomas mostly have a bitter taste).

References

 Most content from up to March 2020 taken from the German page.

Edible fungi
capnoides
Fungi described in 1818
Fungi of Europe
Taxa named by Elias Magnus Fries